Henry Andrews is a fictional character from the CBS crime drama CSI: Crime Scene Investigation, portrayed by Jon Wellner. The character first made an appearance on the fifth season episode "Iced", which aired on May 12, 2005 in the United States.

Casting
Prior to being cast as Henry, actor Jon Wellner made a guest appearance in CSI: Crime Scene Investigation as zookeeper Sam Tracy in the fifth-season episode "Unbearable", which was broadcast on February 10, 2005.

Wellner became a series regular in Season 13.

Storylines
Henry is the toxicology specialist of the Las Vegas Forensics Laboratory, mainly dealing with identifying toxic substances which have undergone human consumption. He has an impressive knowledge of lethal substances, including, but not limited to: illegal drugs, alcoholic beverages, poisons, and hazardous gases (such as carbon monoxide). He constantly exhibits a thorough understanding of the toxins' properties and effects.

He originally worked days (as he mentions in the episode Iced) but kept "getting moved around" by Ecklie. In the later seasons, he is seen more frequently working the graveyard shift. In the episode "Lab Rats," the character has a prominent role and an appreciable amount of screen time compared to previous, short-lived appearances. Wendy refers to him as one of Hodges's "lemmings".

Henry is unmarried, and often jokingly offers to marry his fellow lab tech, fingerprint analyst Mandy Webster. He goes on to reveal that his grandmother lives in a retirement home in Boca Raton, Florida, where he is shuffleboard champion. He refers to himself as a "lady killer" among the senior citizens.

By season eight, the lab technicians have superficially formed a suggested "rat pack," and provide a large amount of comic relief. The episodes "Lab Rats" and "You Kill Me" focus on this group, with Hodges once again acting as their ringleader. In each of the scenarios, Hodges personifies Henry as neurotic and easily intimidated. Henry admits to being frightened of Detective Jim Brass.

Henry often attempts to be comical or witty without avail, which is amusing in its own right. He is intelligent, friendly, and good-natured. On occasions he appears high-strung. He is analytical and digests information well, which helps him reach accurate conclusions and understand facets of human nature.

References

External links

CSI: Crime Scene Investigation characters
Fictional forensic scientists
Fictional toxicologists
Television characters introduced in 2005